Hapoel Rishon LeZion (is a handball team from the city of Rishon LeZion, Israel. competes in the Ligat Winner Big.  The team's colors are red and white, and it hosts its home games in Nahalat Yehuda hall. The captain of the team is Shai Natan.

The team was founded in 1968 and since then has become a regular member of the first division and the most successful team in Israeli handball, having won a record 18 league titles, a record 16 Israeli cups. The team has also participated in the EHF Champions League in 1998, 2000 and in 2001.

Their biggest rival is Maccabi Rishon LeZion, another great Rishon LeZion team. The derby games between them have been very tense throughout the last two decades.

Titles 
Israel Champions (18): 1988, 1990, 1991, 1993, 1994, 1995, 1996, 1997, 1998, 1999, 2000, 2001, 2003, 2004, 2008, 2013, 2015, 2018
Israel Cup Holder (16): 1989, 1990, 1991, 1992, 1993, 1994, 1995, 1996, 1997, 1998, 1999, 2001, 2012, 2015, 2016, 2018

European competition 
EHF Champions League:
 1993/94: 1/8-finals
 1994/95: 1/16-finals
 1995-96: 1/16-finals
 1996/97: 1/16-finals
 1997/98: Group stage
 1998/99: 1/16-finals
 1999/00: 1/4-finals
 2000/01: 2nd qualifying round
 2001/02: Group stage

EHF Cup Winners' Cup:
 1993/94: 1/8-finals
 2002/03: 3rd round

EHF Cup:
 2000/01: Round 4
 2008/09: Round 2
 2010/11: Round 3

Squad 

Goalkeeper
 1   Oron Bargil
 32  Tom Shem-Tov

Wingers
 24  Roi Livgot
 6   Itai Bublil
 30  Itai Surkis
 19  Hen Livgot
 23  Ben Gonen

Line players
 21  Tomer Bodenheimer
 25  Antonio Pribanić
 33  Shai Natan

Back players
 13     Lior Gurman
 7      Vasko Ševaljević
 8      Arel Zaitler
 13     Ido Palach
 90     Aleh Astrashapkin
 10     Ori Palach

Notable former players 
   Milorad Krivokapić
  Draško Mrvaljević
  Bojan Butulija
  Bojan Ljubišić
  Tomislav Stojković
  Miloš Dragaš
  Renato Vugrinec
  Josip Šandrk 
  Novak Bošković
  Savo Mešter
  Duško Čelica
  Peđa Dejanović
  Avishay Smoler	
  Idan Maimon
  Yotam Tal
  Nemanja Pribak

References

External links
Official website
club page in israel handball association

Israeli handball clubs
Handball clubs established in 1968
Sport in Rishon LeZion
Hapoel